The 1954 Swedish speedway season was the 1954 season of motorcycle speedway in Sweden.

Individual

Individual Championship
The 1954 Swedish Individual Speedway Championship final was due to be held during October in Stockholm but was not staged following continual weather problems. Qualifying was supposed to have been over six rounds but only four were completed due to rain and the final was also cancelled due to rain.

Leading qualifying scores at time of cancellation

Team

Team Championship
Vargarna won division 1 for the fourth time in six years and were declared the winners of the Swedish Speedway Team Championship. 

Their team included riders such as Dan Forsberg, Stig Pramberg and Per Olof Söderman.

The league consisted of just one division of ten teams following the demise of Kuggarna	and Stenbockarna.

References

Speedway leagues
Professional sports leagues in Sweden
Swedish
Seasons in Swedish speedway